Eduard Khavrov (born 14 October 1969) is a Ukrainian professional football manager and former player.

On 9 July 2019 Eduard Khavrov was appointed the head coach of FC Krystal Kherson.

References

External links
 

1969 births
Living people
Soviet footballers
Ukrainian footballers
Association football midfielders
FC Mariupol players
Ukrainian football managers
FC Illichivets-2 Mariupol managers
FC Inhulets Petrove managers
FC Krystal Chortkiv managers
FC Krystal Kherson managers
FC Polissya Zhytomyr managers